Jungnang Station is a station on the Gyeongui-Jungang Line & Gyeongchun Line. This station was given this name because the Jungnang River, a tributary of the Han River, flows to the west of this station, and also because it is located in the Jungnang-gu district.

Seoul Metropolitan Subway stations
Railway stations opened in 2005
Metro stations in Jungnang District